The Cardiff Wales Stadium, which is part of Sophia Gardens Cardiff, is a cricket stadium in Cardiff, Wales. It is located in Sophia Gardens on the River Taff. It is home to Glamorgan County Cricket Club and is listed as an international Test cricket venue.

County cricket

The venue is home to Glamorgan County Cricket Club which has played its home matches there since 24 May 1967, after moving away from Cardiff Arms Park. A 125-year lease of the ground was acquired in 1995, with the previous leaseholders, Cardiff Athletic Club, moving its cricket section (Cardiff Cricket Club) to the Diamond Ground in Whitchurch. Beside the cricket ground is the large sports hall complex of the Sport Wales National Centre. Cardiff Corinthians F.C. have previously used the area for football. In July 2007, Glamorgan cricketer Mike Powell was granted his wish to have a rib, removed during surgery, buried at the ground.

International cricket
Sophia Gardens has been an international cricket venue since 20 May 1999, when it played host to the 1999 Cricket World Cup match between Australia and New Zealand. From 2001 to 2012, the ground was a regular venue for One Day Internationals, hosting nine matches in 12 years, but it was not until 2006 that it hosted its first England match, the first match of the series against Pakistan on 30 August 2006. In 2012, the ground was named as one of three venues for the 2013 ICC Champions Trophy, along with The Oval and Edgbaston; it hosted five matches, including the opener between India and South Africa on 6 June 2013, and the semi-final between India and Sri Lanka on 20 June. The ground also hosted two Twenty20 Internationals between England and Pakistan in September 2010, and it is due to host another against Australia in August 2015.

On 11 April 2008, the England and Wales Cricket Board (ECB) announced that the venue would host a series of major Test matches over the next four years. It would host its first Test match on 8 July 2009 as the opening match of an Ashes series between England and Australia. This made Sophia Gardens the 100th Test match venue. In July 2011, the ECB stripped the ground of its right to host the 2012 West Indies Test because of Glamorgan's late payment of the £2.5 million fee it owed for hosting the 2011 Sri Lanka Test. The ground was originally set to host a Test match against New Zealand in 2013, but this was given up in exchange for the 2013 Champions Trophy. The ground was chosen as the venue for the first Test of the 2015 Ashes series.

The ground was one of 11 venues for the 2019 Cricket World Cup. It was host for four group matches.

Stadium redevelopment

The £9.4 million cost to redevelop stadium was funded by with approximately half (£4.5 million) being provided in the form of a Cardiff Council loan.  It is possible that the revamped stadium could host seven Test matches, nine One Day Internationals and two World Cup games up to 2028, injecting at least £50 million into the local economy.  Construction of the redevelopment of Sophia Gardens began in April 2007, and the redeveloped stadium was first opened for competitive matches on 9 May 2008, when the Glamorgan Dragons played the Gloucestershire Gladiators in a Friends Provident Trophy match in which the Gladiators won by six wickets.

Stadium naming rights

On 4 March 2008, Glamorgan Cricket Club announced a 10-year sponsorship deal with SWALEC, thought to be the biggest single sponsorship by a county cricket club, giving SWALEC the naming rights to the new stadium, worth in excess of £1.5 million over 10 years.

In June 2015, ahead of the First Test of the 2015 Ashes series, the stadium was renamed as simply "The SSE SWALEC" in reflection of the ownership of sponsors SWALEC by SSE plc. The new logo from June 2015 was designed to reflect the shape of the stadium. In April 2018 the stadium officially reverted to its original name of Sophia Gardens following the end of the sponsorship deal.

See also
 Sport in Cardiff
 List of cricket grounds in England and Wales
 List of sports venues with sole naming rights
 Cricket Wales

Notes

External links

 Official website
 Ground profile from Cricinfo

Landmarks in Cardiff
Sports venues in Cardiff
Stadiums in Cardiff
Glamorgan County Cricket Club
Test cricket grounds in Wales
Cricket grounds in Glamorgan
Sports venues completed in 1967
1999 Cricket World Cup stadiums
2019 Cricket World Cup stadiums